Bravington railway station was a railway station on the Noojee railway line. It was located in the town of Bravington. It was opened on 12 May 1890 when the railway line was laid through the town and closed in 1958.

References 

Disused railway stations in Victoria (Australia)
Railway stations in Australia opened in 1890
Transport in Gippsland (region)
Shire of Baw Baw